Santi Bai 'Maya' Hanoomanjee GCSK (Hindi:माया हनुमानजी Born GHOSE, on 5 October 1952) is the High Commissioner of Mauritius to India. She is a Mauritian politician and former Civil Servant who was the speaker of the National Assembly of Mauritius from December 2014 to November 2019. She was the first woman to hold this constitutional office and accordingly was the highest ranked female in the republic. She is a former Minister of Health of Mauritius who served from 11 May 2010 until the coalition government of Mauritian Labour Party & Militant Socialist Movement dissolved in July 2011. She served in Navin Ramgoolam's Cabinet. She served as 2nd Member of Parliament elected in constituency no 14, Black River & La Savanne from 2005 to 2014. She is a member of the MSM and was the first woman to hold the office of Speaker.

Hanoomanjee is a former civil servant and retired in 2005 as a Permanent Secretary just before officially joining the MSM.  She served as the Permanent Secretary for Finance and Health in that time. She was decorated on 2015 national day by President Kailash Purryag and was made Grand Commander of the Star and Key of the Indian Ocean (GCSK). Maya Hanoomanjee has been married for 40 years and has three daughters.

Early life
Hanoomanjee was born in the Ghose family related to the Ballah family. She is the first cousin of Sarojini Ballah and sister-in-law of Anerood Jugnauth. She is also the first cousin  once removed of the current prime minister Pravind Jugnauth. She had her primary education in Aryan Vedic School in Vacoas, secondary education at Queen Elizabeth College, Rose Hill and completed her degree at University of Mauritius. She was a civil servant from 1971 to 2005 and retired as a Permanent Secretary in May 2005.  During her tenure as a civil servant, she served as the Chairperson of the Tea Board from 1996 to 2004, Chairperson of the Farmers Service Commission from 1998 to 2004,  Chairperson of the Sugar Planter's Mechanical Pool Corporation from 1997 to 2004, Chairperson of the Mauritius Sugar Authority - 2001 to May 2005 and was the first Chairperson of the Mauritius Revenue Authority from 2004 to May 2005. She was also a board member in various committees. In the same capacity, she represented Mauritius in discussions at ACP-EU level in Sugar Protocol issues, lobbying missions in EU countries regarding Sugar Protocol, negotiations at WTO  regarding trade issues and part of several international summits and conferences.

Political career
In 2005, she joined the Militant Socialist Movement (MSM) party. She was nominated by her party in constituency no 14, Black River & La Savanne, the largest constituency in Mauritius, in 2005 and she went on to win the elections. She won from the same constituency in 2010 and became the Minister of Health of Mauritius from 11 May 2010 until the coalition government of Mauritian Labour Party & Militant Socialist Movement broke in July 2011. She served in Navin Ramgoolam's Cabinet during her tenure as a minister. She served as an opposition member till 6 October 2014. In December 2014, she was elected as the speaker of the National assembly. She is the first woman to hold this constitutional office and accordingly is the 2nd ranked female in the republic after President Ameenah Gurib. She was also elected President of the Commonwealth Parliamentary Association (Africa Region) on 14 August 2015 in Kenya, Nairobi at the 46th CPA (Africa Region) Conference. She was conferred highest distinction of the country and elevated to the rank of the Grand Commander of the Star and Key (GCSK) on 12 March 2015 for her political, social and public service.

Controversies
In 1986 it was revealed that Maya Hanoomanjee, then Permanent Secretary, had issued diplomatic passports on a weekend to allow four members of Parliament to travel to Amsterdam where they were arrested with 25 kg of the drug heroin in their suitcase. This became known as the Amsterdam Boys scandal which was also linked to the 1989 arrest of High Commissioner of Mauritius (for UK, Vatican and West Germany) Soo Soobiah and his wife Muriel. In 2011 the Finance Minister Pravind Jugnauth and Health Minister Hanoomanjee were accused of using public funds to buy the Medpoint Clinic which was owned by Pravind Jugnauth's sister and brother-in-law. All three of them denied the allegation. She was arrested on 22 July 2011 by the Anti-Corruption Commission (ICAC) on charges of incurring losses to the State to the tune of 144 million Rupees by approving to buy a family owned clinic to be made a government geriatric clinic. Six ministers from MSM party resigned from the cabinet condemning the arrest of Hanoomanjee. On 11 April 2013, the Director of Public Prosecutions, considered equivalent to the prosecutor relieved her on account of non-availability of corroborating evidence against her. Hanoomanjee's daughter Naila Hanoomanjee was appointed as the chief executive officer of the State Property Development Company Ltd (SPDC), manager of the Port Louis Waterfront and the Mahébourg Waterfront during October 2015. There were allegations that laws were bent to accommodate her, while Hanoomanjee refuted the claims stating that her daughter underwent multiple selection procedures and was chosen on merit.

References

1952 births
Living people
Speakers of the National Assembly (Mauritius)
Government ministers of Mauritius
Militant Socialist Movement politicians
Place of birth missing (living people)
Women government ministers of Mauritius
21st-century women politicians
University of Mauritius alumni
Mauritian politicians of Indian descent